"Dark Places" is a song by the American musician Beck. It was released on November 7, 2019 as the third single from his fourteenth studio album Hyperspace. A lyric video was also created for the song, made by Eddie Obrand. Consequence of Sound described the video as "dreamy".

Critical reception
Tom Breihan of Stereogum called "Dark Places" "a slow, ambling song, built from both an acoustic-guitar strum and a rich, hazy synth sound. Beck, singing as high as his voice will let him go, reflects on a breakup", as evidenced by the lyrics "Time moves on, and on and love, it goes / Now she’s gone, and all I see are shadows". He thought that the song sounded closer to the album Sea Change, rather than Midnite Vultures. Exclaim! described the song as "more than a little smooth".

References

2019 singles
2019 songs
Beck songs
Songs written by Beck
Songs written by Pharrell Williams